Sang Divar (also Romanized as Sang Dīvār; also known as Sangetown, Sangīfān, and Sangyufan) is a village in Hezarmasjed Rural District, in the Central District of Kalat County, Razavi Khorasan Province, Iran. At the 2006 census, its population was 220, in 50 families.

References 

Populated places in Kalat County